Hemraj may refer to:

Kacharu Lal Hemraj Jain, Indian politician
Hemraj Verma, Indian politician
Sheth Gopalji Hemraj High School